Italian Braille is the braille alphabet of the Italian language, both in Italy and in Switzerland. It is very close to French Braille, with some differences in punctuation.

Alphabet
Since French Braille does not have a letter for ó, Italian Braille uses  ò for both ò and ó.

{| class="wikitable" style="line-height: 1.2"
|- align=center
|  a
|  b
|  c
|  d
|  e
|  f
|  g
|  h
|  i
|- align=center
|  l
|  m
|  n
|  o
|  p
|  q
|  r
|  s
|  t
|- align=center
|  u
|  v
|  z
|  é
|  à
|  è
|  ù
|  ì
|  ò, ó
|}

If other letters are needed, such as j, k, w, x, y or accented vowels such as î, French Braille assignments are used.   j is used as the digit 0.

Numbers

Punctuation

 is the full stop / period;  is the digit separator in numbers.

*According to Unesco (2013), Italian Braille uses the old French parentheses  as square brackets. According to the Unione Italiana Ciechi di Legnano, those are used for parentheses; square brackets are not given. ( ç and  y are not part of the Italian alphabet.) However, the Unione specifies than the symmetrically paired brackets are mathematical notation, so it may be that the old, generic  is the convention for either parentheses or square brackets in non-mathematical text.

Formatting

References

Unione Italiana Ciechi di Legnano
Codice Braille from the Unione Italiana dei Ciechi e degli Ipovedenti
UNESCO (2013) World Braille Usage, 3rd edition.

French-ordered braille alphabets
Italian language